Events in the year 1963 in Ireland.

Incumbents
 President: Éamon de Valera
 Taoiseach: Seán Lemass (FF)
 Tánaiste:  Seán MacEntee (FF)
 Minister for Finance: James Ryan 
 Chief Justice: Cearbhall Ó Dálaigh 
 Dáil: 17th 
 Seanad: 10th

Events
 24 January – The Minister for Justice, Charles Haughey, announced that the government proposed to abolish the death penalty.
 29 January – A new control tower opened at Shannon Airport.
 20 May – The Minister for Education, Patrick Hillery, announced plans for comprehensive schools and regional technical colleges.
 3 June – Teilifís Éireann closed down immediately after its 9 pm news bulletin as a mark of respect following the death of Pope John XXIII.

Visit by John F Kennedy 

 26 June – President Kennedy of the United States arrived in Ireland for a four-day visit. He was greeted at Dublin Airport by President De Valera and Taoiseach Seán Lemass. His motorcade to the Phoenix Park was met by large crowds in O'Connell Street and Dame Street.
 27 June – Kennedy flew to New Ross by helicopter where he made a speech to a crowd. He drove to his ancestral home nearby in Dunganstown where he met extended family. Afterwards he flew to Wexford where he was given the freedom of the town. That evening, he attended a garden party at Áras an Uachtaráin, home of the Irish president, and afterwards attended a state dinner hosted in his honour by the Taoiseach at Iveagh House in Dublin.
 28 June – Kennedy flew to Cork by helicopter. After a motorcade through the crowded city, he was awarded the freedom of the city. Back in Dublin in the afternoon, he visited Arbour Hill where he laid a wreath at the graves of executed leaders of 1916 Rising. Afterwards, he visited Leinster House where he became the first statesman to address both Houses of the Oireachtas. At Dublin Castle, he was conferred with degrees of Doctor of Laws by both the National University of Ireland and by Dublin University. He was also awarded the freedom of the city of Dublin.
 29 June – Kennedy flew by helicopter to Galway. His motorcade took him to City Hall where he was made a freeman of Galway. He made a speech to a large crowd in Eyre Square. Another motorcade took him to his helicopter in Salthill from where he flew to Limerick where he landed at Greenpark Racecourse. He was conferred with the freedom of Limerick. After speaking to the crowd, he flew to Shannon Airport where he made a farewell speech before returning to the United States on Air Force One.
 4 October – Speaking on the nuclear test ban at the United Nations in New York, the Minister for External Affairs, Frank Aiken, called for an end to all nuclear weapons.
 16 October – Taoiseach Seán Lemass was greeted by U.S. president John Kennedy at the White House where he inspected a guard of honour.
 1 November – Domhnall Ua Buachalla, the last Governor-General of the Irish Free State, was buried in Dublin.
 7 November – The Beatles arrived in Dublin for a concert in the Adelphi Cinema, the only time they performed in Ireland.

Death of John F Kennedy 
 22 November – President de Valera addressed the nation on the death of U.S. president John Kennedy.
 24 November – De Valera left to attend Kennedy's funeral. He was accompanied by cadets who were invited by Jacqueline Kennedy to form a guard of honour.
 26 November – Ireland held a national day of mourning for President Kennedy.

Arts and literature
 2 June – Benjamin Britten's A Hymn of St Columba premièred at Gartan in County Donegal.
 Cork Opera House reopened after being fully rebuilt.
 John McGahern's semi-autobiographical first novel, The Barracks, was published.

Sports
 Shelbourne won the FAI Cup.
 Paddy Prendergast became the first Irish-based horse trainer to be British flat racing Champion Trainer; he retained the title for two more years.

Births
 7 January – Tony O'Sullivan, Cork hurler.
 February – Theresa Lowe, television presenter.
 3 March – Conor Lenihan, Fianna Fáil party Teachta Dála (TD) for Dublin South-West and Minister of State.
 19 March – Mark Dearey, businessman and Green Party councillor in Dundalk.
 25 March – Kevin O'Rourke, economic historian, born in Switzerland.
 26 March – Paul Doolin, association football player.
 29 March – Pat Gallagher, Labour Party politician.
 3 April – Ciarán Cuffe, Green Party TD for Dún Laoghaire.
 4 April – Graham Norton, actor, comedian and television presenter.
 1 June – Michael Creed, Fine Gael party TD for Cork North-West.
 3 June – Lucy Grealy, poet and memoirist (died 2002).
 13 June – Larry Tompkins, Kildare and Cork Gaelic footballer.
 21 June – Carlos O'Connell, decathlete.
 25 June – Liam Walsh, Kilkenny hurler.
 26 June – Tomás Mulcahy, Cork hurler.
 23 July – Andy Townsend, association football player.
 28 July – Eamon Ryan, Green Party TD for Dublin South and Minister for the Environment, Climate and Communications.
 22 August – Terry McHugh, javelin thrower.
 31 August – Todd Carty, actor.
 10 September – Marian Keyes, novelist.
 24 September – Margaret Cox, Fianna Fáil senator.
 25 September – Niall Cahalane, Cork Gaelic footballer.
 9 November – Kieran O'Regan, association football player.
 13 November – Joe Dooley, Offaly hurler, manager.
 1 December – Paul Bradford, Fine Gael senator.
 5 December – Tony Keady, Galway hurler (died 2017).

Full date unknown
 Pat Boran, poet.
 Orla Kiely, fashion and textile designer.
 Bryan Smyth, singer, actor and television presenter.

Deaths
 17 January – Thomas Johnson, first parliamentary leader of the Labour Party, aged 91.
 1 February – John Cardinal D'Alton, Archbishop of Armagh and Primate of All Ireland from 1946 to 1963 (born 1882).
 4 February – Brinsley MacNamara, novelist and playwright (born 1890).
 22 February – Padraig O'Keeffe, fiddle player (born 1887).
 3 March – Brian O'Higgins, Sinn Féin party member of parliament and party president (born 1882).
 19 March – Joseph Brennan, civil servant and Governor of the Central Bank of Ireland (born 1887).
 16 May – Patrick Little, Fianna Fáil TD and Cabinet minister (born 1884).
 31 May – Seán O'Hegarty, Irish Republican Army member during the Irish War of Independence (born 1881).
 12 June – Andrew Cunningham, 1st Viscount Cunningham of Hyndhope, British admiral of the Second World War and First Sea Lord (born 1883).
 23 June – George C. Bennett, Cumann na nGaedheal party TD, later joined Fine Gael and Seanad Éireann member (born 1877).
 11 October – John Galvin, Fianna Fáil TD (born 1907).
 30 October – Hugh O'Flaherty, Catholic priest, saved about 4,000 Allied soldiers and Jews in the Vatican during World War II (born 1898).
 30 October – Domhnall Ua Buachalla, member of the First Dáil, Fianna Fáil TD, last Governor-General of the Irish Free State (born 1866).
 2 November – Daniel Mannix, Catholic clergyman, Archbishop of Melbourne for 46 years (born 1864).
 22 November – C. S. Lewis, novelist (born 1898).
 November – Patrick MacGill, journalist, poet, and novelist (born 1889).
 4 December – William Norton, Labour Party leader, TD, and Cabinet minister (born 1900).
 15 December – Oscar Traynor, Fianna Fáil politician (born 1886).
December – Andy Kennedy, association footballer (born 1897).

Full date unknown
 Charles Campbell, 2nd Baron Glenavy, peer (born 1885).

See also
 1963 in Irish television

References

 
1960s in Ireland
Ireland
Years of the 20th century in Ireland